Lacy-Van Vleet House is a historic home located at Dryden in Tompkins County, New York. It was built about 1845 and is a -story, five-by-four-bay, frame residence representative of the transition from the Federal to Greek Revival style.   It features Doric order porticoed porches on the front and side.

It was listed on the National Register of Historic Places in 1984.

References

Houses on the National Register of Historic Places in New York (state)
Federal architecture in New York (state)
Houses completed in 1845
Houses in Tompkins County, New York
National Register of Historic Places in Tompkins County, New York